Kalininsky District is a district of the federal city of St. Petersburg, Russia. As of the 2010 Census, its population was 504,641; up from 469,409 recorded in the 2002 Census.

Etymology
The district was named after Mikhail Kalinin (1875–1946), Russian Soviet Bolshevik revolutionary and politician.

Municipal divisions
Kalininsky District comprises the following seven municipal okrugs:
#21
Akademicheskoye
Finlyandsky
Grazhdanka
Piskaryovka
Prometey
Severny

Overview

The historical nucleus of the district, together with its western neighbour Vyborgskiy District, is in the south, on the right bank of the Neva, forming the traditionally industrial Vyborg Side part of the city, the Side being the area between the Neva and the right bank of its north most major distributary the Bolshaya Nevka.

Many factories, opened there in the 19th century by Russian and European entrepreneurs, were nationalized after the Socialist Revolution of 1917 and further developed throughout most of the 20th century until 1990s fall of the Soviet Union when many of industrial facilities were closed down or moved out of town. During the Soviet times there appeared in the district several industrial research and development institutes, some of them having their roots in the local Polytechnical Institute. The early 20th-century revolutionary history of the Vyborg Side was shown in an eponymous feature film.

In this industrial environment there still are 19th-century apartment buildings, giving way in some places to their counterparts from the 1930s to the 1950s.

To the north of the industrial area, rural and semirural homes gave way since the early 1960s to mass-produced 5-, 9- and 12-storey concrete blocks of flats with spacious green courtyards and broad streets. Green areas include several parks.

References

Notes

Sources

 
States and territories established in 1936